Kubbar is a sandy island of Kuwait in the Persian Gulf, covered with shrub. It is located roughly 30 kilometers off the southern coast of Kuwait and 29 kilometres off the coast of Failaka. The island is nearly circular, with a diameter of 370 to 380 meters, corresponding to an area of about 11 ha.

History
Around six Iraqi soldiers killed in the Gulf War of 1991 lie buried on the island. Their graves are marked discreetly, in the Islamic manner.

Environment
Kubbar is sandy, with low coasts and sparsely vegetated. It is surrounded by coral reefs and is therefore popular with scuba divers. The coral reefs in this region are included in the regular ongoing voluntary work of the renowned award-winning Kuwait Dive Team (KDT), a group voted by United Nations as the best in the world.

Important Bird Areas
The island has been recognised an Important Bird Area (IBA) by BirdLife International because it supports a breeding colony of white-cheeked terns.

See also
List of lighthouses in Kuwait

References

External links
 Picture of Kubbar Island Lighthouse 

Uninhabited islands of Kuwait
Lighthouses in Kuwait
Important Bird Areas of Kuwait
Seabird colonies